The BP Building, previously also known as the Axa-Royale Belge Tower, is a suspended-structure office building in Antwerp, Belgium, designed by the Belgian architect Léon Stynen. The building was completed in 1963 and features a unique cantilevered floor structure and cable supports. All of the floors are supported with external cables that are attached to roof beams: the weight of roof beams, all floors, and the external walls are carried by a center core. The building was commissioned by BP and is still referred to as the "BP Building", but is now owned by Buysse & Partners Smart Assets since 2018. Its architecture has been classified as Modernist and Brutalist.

Design
In 1963, well-known Belgian architect Leon Stynen experimented with a technique which allowed a cantilevered facade. All of the floors and the facade of the building are held up with steel cables which are supported from rooftop beams. The design allows for a greater unobstructed interior space. It was Europe's first building which made use of "suspended construction".

The floors are supported by external cables, which allows each floor to have no internal columns. The ten floors are all similar and divided by interior wood-based walls. The facade is a type of curtain wall with metal grids. A restaurant is located on the upper level of the building.

Cables are then hung from the crossbeams, and these support the floors.

Axa-Royale Belge Tower
The building was purchased by Axa Bank Belgium and renamed the Axa-Royale Belge Tower. It underwent a major renovation and most of the original interior is now replaced.

On 5 March 2001 the building was classified as an architectural monument based on historical and architectural value.

Awards
1964 SBUAM Prize Société belge des Urbanistes et Architectes modernistes.

References

1963 introductions
Buildings and structures in Antwerp
Buildings and structures completed in 1963
Modernist architecture
Office buildings completed in 1963
Suspended structures
BP buildings and structures